Fragagnano is a town and comune in the province of Taranto, Apulia, southeast Italy. The town was historically an Arbëreshë community, but has since assimilated.

References

Cities and towns in Apulia
Localities of Salento
Arbëresh settlements